220 Volt is a Swedish heavy metal band, formed in 1979 by guitar players Thomas Drevin and Mats Karlsson. The band released albums on the CBS Records and Epic Records labels.

History 
The band's career began in 1979, but gained traction when they released the first single "Prisoner Of War" in 1982. When a radio station in New Jersey played the single it soon became one of the most wanted songs, the record company CBS then offered them a record contract.

The first "220 Volt" disc was released in 1983 and it sold around 10,000 copies in Sweden alone. In addition to Sweden, the band has been very popular in Japan, Germany and the United States. In 1984, the band performed with Nazareth (12 concerts) and in 1986 with AC/DC (7 concerts).  These gigs increased the band's popularity.

In 1992, 220 Volt disbanded, but in 2002, the band was reunited with the same lineup as on their first single. They organized popular concerts both in Jämtland and elsewhere in Sweden. Volume 1 was their first recording released in the 2000s. It contains both new material and parts of a concert from Sweden Rock 2002. The printed edition was limited to 1000 copies, but is available on iTunes.

In 2005, the band released its first live album, "Made in Jämtland" recorded during a number of concerts in just Jämtland. At the end of 2008, drummer Peter Hermansson stopped and no permanent substitute has been announced.

In 2009, the band recorded a new EP with new versions of the popular "Heavy Christmas" and 3 other songs. Singer Jocke Lundholm returned for this recording and the band also borrowed drummer Björn Höglund from Hoven Droven. The album was released under the title Heavy Christmas - Revisited.

Members
Current members
 Mats Karlsson – guitars, vocals (1979–1992, 2002–present)
 Thomas Drevin – guitars (1979–1984, 2002–present)
 Peter Hermansson – drums (1982–1992, 2002–2008, 2012–present)
 Göran Nyström – lead vocals (2016–present)
 Mats Vassfjord – bass (2016–present)

Former members
Mike Krusenberg (ca. 1982–1992, 2002–2013)
 Christer Nääs – lead vocals (1979–1983, 2002–2008)
 Tommy Hellström – bass (1979–1980)
 Micke Larsson – bass (1984)
 Pelle Hansson – drums (1979–1982)
 Jocke Lundholm - lead vocals (1983–1990, 1997, 2009)
 Peter Olander – guitar (1984–1992)
 Per Englund – lead vocals (1990–1992) (never lead vocals for 220 Volt, lead vocals for Voltergeist)
 Anders Engberg – lead vocals (2013–2015)

Discography
Studio albums
 220 Volt (1983, CBS)
 Powergames (1984, CBS)
 Mind Over Muscle (1985, CBS)
 Eye to Eye (1988, Epic)
 Lethal Illusion (1997, Empire Records) (digitally released 2009)
 Walking in Starlight (2014, AOR Heaven)

EP
 Heavy Christmas (1987, CBS)
 Heavy Christmas – Revisited (2009) (Digitally released 2009)

Compilations
 Electric Messengers (released for the U.S. market 1985, Epic)
 Young and Wild (1987, CBS)
 Volume 1 (2002) (digitally released 2009)

Live albums
 Made in Jamtland (live) (2005, Swedmetal Records) (digitally released 2009)

Digital single;
 "One Good Reason" (2013)

External links
 220 Volt´s Official Website
 220 Volt - Encyclopaedia Metallum: The Metal Archives

References

Musical groups established in 1979
Swedish hard rock musical groups
Swedish heavy metal musical groups
1979 establishments in Sweden